The Cal Poly Mustangs are the athletic teams representing California Polytechnic State University in San Luis Obispo, California. The university fields twenty-one teams and compete in NCAA Division I; they are primarily members of the Big West Conference, but the football team plays in the Big Sky Conference, the wrestling team is an associate member of the Pac-12 Conference, and the swimming and diving program competes as an affiliate member in the Mountain Pacific Sports Federation.

Nickname
The Cal Poly official team nickname is the "Mustangs." The nickname was chosen in a 1925 vote by the students. The two finalists were "Mustangs" and "Mules" and the students chose "Mustangs."

History

Cal Poly athletic history

Early athletic program history
The Cal Poly Mustangs athletic department's first sports team was fielded in 1907 as the men's basketball team played their first game. The university was not yet a four-year institution, but the school sponsored sports.

Student referendum and move to NCAA Division I
Cal Poly put a referendum vote to its student body on Nov. 20–21, 1991. The referendum passed, with students voting to elevate all 16 NCAA sports teams at the time (since increased to 21 intercollegiate teams in the years to follow) from Division II of the NCAA to Division I by the 1994-95 school year, passed by 267 votes in the largest voter turnout in school history, featuring 10,369 total votes cast, with 5,318 (or 51.2 percent) passing the measure. This move would be accommodated by the student body individually paying a total of $35 more per quarter by 1994 (steadily going in increments from the incumbent $8 Athletics fee at the time to $43 per quarter by 1994).

Afterward, the NCAA officially certified Cal Poly as a Division I-AA football school on August 9, 1993. Its first year of playing at the Division I level in all sports (volleyball and wrestling were already Division I, being the two exceptions) was 1994-95.

Conference alignment
Announced October 14, 1994, Cal Poly joined the Big West Conference for a majority of its sports programs, from the American West Conference. The 1996-97 school year then marked Cal Poly's first season competing in the Big West.

Cal Poly was accepted into the Big Sky Conference as an affiliate member for football on September 7, 2010. The Mustangs' first-ever Big Sky game was played on September 22, 2012, a 28-20 home win over UC Davis.

Adidas partnership
On May 25, 2017, Cal Poly announced an exclusive partnership with adidas. The partnership beginning in June 2017 would provide official footwear, apparel and various equipment items.

Academic progress rate public recognition awards
In May 2019, Cal Poly received a department-record seven Public Recognition Awards from the NCAA for Academic Progress Rate performance for the 2017-18 academic year. The seven awards included six from Big West Conference teams in the department, the most throughout the Big West (edging UC Davis by one award). The Mustangs collected four NCAA APR awards for the 2018-19 year, again leading the BWC.

Philanthropic endeavors
From 2007 through 2019, the Cal Poly softball program raised over $21,900 for the Hearst Cancer Resource Center with its annual StrikeOut Cancer Challenge event.

From 2012 to 2019, Cal Poly student-athletes raised $11,179 through the Big West Conference's annual February Coin Drive, with previous causes also including the Jessie Rees Foundation and CURE International. In 2019, Cal Poly student-athletes raised more than $3,300 for Hearst Cancer Resource Center at nearby French Hospital as part of the 12th annual February Coin Drive. The total was the most Cal Poly has raised in a single year and ranked second among the conference's nine universities for 2019.

Starting in December 2015, Cal Poly student-athletes have been actively involved with the Salvation Army's Adopt-an-Angel program, purchasing toys, clothing and gift cards while collecting donations to benefit local families in the San Luis Obispo area. In 2017, Mustang student-athletes adopted 50 children from 24 families, an increase of three sponsored children from the 2016 season. The December 2018 drive saw Cal Poly student-athletes adopt 32 children for the program.

Controversies

NCAA infractions
In 1987 while competing as an NCAA Division II school, the National Collegiate Athletic Association found the athletic department guilty of infractions relating to the men's basketball program. During the course of the investigation, then head coach Ernie Wheeler resigned from his position and was later publicly reprimanded.

As the department was transitioning from Division I to NCAA Division I in 1994, the department self-reported violations related to the baseball program. Cal Poly identified head coach Steve McFarland as having given improper financial aid to both players and members of his coaching staff. In 1995, the NCAA accepted Cal Poly's self-imposed penalties which included forfeiture of their NCAA Division II baseball championship and other top finishes and a postseason ban.

In April 2019, the athletic department was placed on probation for multiple years and was forced to vacate regular season championships and conference tournament records by the NCAA. The NCAA reported years worth of infractions involving 265 athletes across 18 sports. Additionally, the school must now inform all recruits about the department's infractions prior to official visits. In deciding on the severity of punishment, the NCAA noted Cal Poly's two earlier infractions from 1987 and 1995. The athletic department appealed, but the decision was upheld in February 2020.

Other athletic department controversies
In November 2013, a student assistant coach who previously played for the Cal Poly Mustangs football team was shot in a drug deal. The following year in August 2014, further problems beset the football team when 5 current Cal Poly student-athletes were arrested and charged with a total of 23 felonies which made national headlines. The players were subsequently suspended indefinitely from the team.

California Polytechnic State University president, Jeffrey Armstrong, stated that the August 2014 event "bears striking commonalities" with the November 2013 event, which was also noted by San Luis Obispo Police Department Chief Steve Gesell as having "disturbing" similarities. Armstrong, with athletic director, Don Oberhelman, launched an investigation into the football team's potential further involvement with illegal drugs and criminal activity and rolled out a new drug policy for the athletics department. It was reported by The Tribune that cost was a factor cited by Cal Poly when testing just 41 of its 540 student-athletes for banned substances within the last year. Oberhelman later stated that some of the players involved "... should not have been at Cal Poly." He also stated that he had heard of illegal drug usage among members of the football team. According to current and former players who spoke with The Tribune confidentially, the consensus was that illegal drug usage at the football program was widespread, with estimates ranging between 40% to 60% of the student-athletes. Athletic director Oberhelman kept faith in head coach Tim Walsh and his coaching staff despite Randy Hanson, a former coach brought on by Walsh, had multiple felony charges brought upon him just a few years earlier. One of the student-athletes' lawyers in the August 2014 event later accused head coach Tim Walsh in court of coercion to talk to the police without a lawyer present.

In 2014, Cal Poly went to court to cover up or remove mentions of Moriarty Enterprises from the scoreboard at Alex G. Spanos Stadium. Al Moriarty, a former Cal Poly football player who was inducted to the Cal Poly Hall of Fame in 2002, purchased naming rights to the scoreboard in 2009 for a total of $625,000. He was convicted of running a ponzi scheme and Cal Poly argued that they were "...suffering harm by having the name 'Moriarty Enterprises' remain on the scoreboard." When bankruptcy trustees asked Cal Poly for the money to be returned to benefit Moriarty's creditors, Cal Poly declined. After nearly a year in court, an agreement was reached wherein Cal Poly repaid $480,000 of the original donation to remove mentions of Moriarty, leaving the school with a $145,000 profit from the original sponsorship.

In April 2015, a football student-athlete was arrested for driving under the influence, a felony, after crashing his car. A number of the passengers in the car were also football student-athletes. Previously in March 2011, a different Cal Poly football player was arrested for a DUI and ultimately chose to transfer out of the program.

Sports sponsored

Baseball

The Cal Poly Mustangs baseball program first fielded a team in 1948.

Men's basketball

The Cal Poly Mustangs men's basketball team's first season was 1907 and its first season as a four-year institution was in 1941-42. The team had its most successful year in 2014, when the team won the Big West Tournament, clinching its first NCAA basketball tournament bid in school history at the Division I level.

Women's basketball

The Cal Poly Mustangs women's basketball team's first season was the 1974–75 season.

Women's beach volleyball
Cal Poly beach volleyball was founded in July 2013. It became the university's 21st NCAA sport. In February 2016, Cal Poly hired Todd Rogers, a 2008 Olympic gold medalist in the sport, as its new head coach.

The Mustangs had arguably their most successful season in the spring of 2019, winning the Big West Conference Championship over Hawai'i, 3-2 in Malibu, California. Following the title, Cal Poly advanced to the eight-team NCAA Beach Volleyball Championship, losing to Florida State in the opening match before dropping a rematch against Hawai'i on ESPN. Cal Poly also qualified for the NCAA tournament in 2021 and 2022.

Men's and women's cross country
In 2019, coach Mark Conover and his men's squad collected their fourth straight Big West Conference title and the men's team's 17th crown in a 22-year span. Their last national placing as a team was in 2011, when they finished 28th at the National Cross Country Championships. In 2018, the women's program, coached by Priscilla Bayley, captured its third Big West Conference crown in a four-year stretch.

The men's cross country team has appeared in the NCAA Division I Championships as a full squad seven times, with their highest finish being 10th place in the 2004–05 school year. The Cal Poly women's cross country team hasn't made the NCAA Division I Championships as a full team, but in 2018 advanced both Miranda Daschian and Katie Izzo as individuals to the NCAA National Cross Country Championships in Madison, Wisconsin. Peyton Bilo was the program's most recent All-American, taking 23rd place at the 2016 national championships as a sophomore. Conover, the 1988 U.S. Olympic Marathon Trials champion, passed in April 2022 following a battle with cancer. 

On June 20, 2022, Ryan Vanhoy, previously coaching at Ole Miss, was appointed to lead Cal Poly's program as track and field and cross country director.

Team USA members

 Cal Poly alumnus Phillip Reid represented Team USA at the Great Edinburgh International Run in Scotland in 2012-13 and at the North America/Central America/Caribbean Championships in Jamaica in 2013.

Football

Mustang Football plays in the Big Sky Conference, competing in the NCAA Division I FCS. Prior to joining the Big Sky Conference in 2012, the team competed in the Great West Conference and was the first Great West Football Conference participant in the Football Championship Subdivision playoffs. Each year Cal Poly plays rival UC Davis in the annual Battle for the Golden Horseshoe.

The Cal Poly Mustangs have an NCAA Division I FCS Tournament record of 1-4 through four appearances:

1960 Cal Poly football team airline crash

Men's golf

Pro alumni 

 Former Mustang Loren Roberts has earned more than 25 career pro wins at various tournaments.
 Cal Poly's Travis Bertoni, who won three consecutive Big West Conference Golfer of the Year awards from 2004-06, played at the U.S. Open in 2008.
 Former Mustang Justin De Los Santos played at the British Open in 2022.

Women's golf
Cal Poly won the 2017 Big West Conference championship at Oak Quarry Golf Club in Riverside, California, besting the field with a combined total of 887 strokes. After winning the title, the Mustangs advanced to their first Division I NCAA Regional tournament, finishing 16th in Albuquerque, New Mexico at UNM South Championship Golf Course. Cal Poly also won back-to-back BWC team championships in 2021 and 2022.

Men's soccer

The Cal Poly Mustangs men's soccer team has had success in recent years. In 2008, coach Paul Holocher led his team to the NCAA Division I tournament; they went on to beat UCLA and ended up losing to UC Irvine in the second round. Coach Steve Sampson led the team back to the NCAA tournament in 2015, and three Cal Poly players were selected in the 2016 MLS SuperDraft, tied for the seventh-most nationally.

Cal Poly soccer has a strong fan base, averaging 2,017 fans per match in 2019, ranking No. 5 across the country. In 2011, CollegeSoccerNews.com chose Cal Poly vs. UC Santa Barbara as the No. 1 rivalry in college soccer. Since 2007, the rivalry matches have regularly drawn upwards of 8,000 fans.

The men's soccer team have an NCAA Division I Tournament record of 1–3 through three appearances and have never advanced past the second round:

Women's soccer
Cal Poly's women's soccer program is coached by Alex Crozier, formerly an assistant coach at Santa Clara under Jerry Smith. Entering the 2022 season, Crozier held a won-loss-draw career record of 296-208-56 in 30 previous seasons (including the canceled year of 2020), ranking No. 30 in NCAA history for career head coaching wins among active coaches.

The Mustangs have an NCAA Division I Tournament record of 1-5 through five appearances, with the win coming over Fresno State in the first round in 1999, 2-1 in Fresno. Cal Poly fell 3-1 at Stanford in the second round.

Pro alumni

 Gina Oceguera became the first Cal Poly women's soccer alumna to play professionally in 2000-02, in the WUSA, after being drafted by the San Diego Spirit with the 35th overall selection of the 2000 draft. Oceguera played the 2001 season for the Bay Area CyberRays, helping to lead the club to the championship.
 From 2016 to 2017, former Cal Poly goalkeeper Alyssa Giannetti played for Arna-Bjornar in the Toppserien in Bergen, Norway. She signed with the club in February 2016. Giannetti was named the league's Goalkeeper of the Year following her rookie season.
 Elise Krieghoff, a teammate of Giannetti with the Mustangs from 2012 to 2015, signed a contract with the Boston Breakers of the NWSL in April 2016.

Softball

Pro draft choices
 Sierra Hyland, P: 2017 NPF 4th overall (Chicago Bandits)/2020 Olympian

Men's and women's swimming and diving

International record-holders 

 Jimmy Deiparine went on to set the Filipino national record in the 100-meter breaststroke: 1:02.08 in 2016. In 2017, Deiparine won the silver medal for the 100m breast at the Southeast Asian Games in Kuala Lumpur. Also in 2017, Deiparine swam at the FINA World Championships in Budapest, breaking his own 50m breast Philippine national record, taking 36th place out of 81 swimmers, via 28.13 seconds.

Olympians 
 Cal Poly's Gene Lenz competed in the 1960 Olympics, earning seventh place in the 400m freestyle final in Rome, with a time of 4:26.8.

Men's and women's track and field

All-Americans
Combined, all-time in its history, including individual national champions, Cal Poly has produced 522 total All-Americans specific to track & field. 72 of these All-America honors have been awarded in Division I (with 27 to men and 45 to women, including AIAW certificates as well as indoor-season accolades), and 450 All-America honors were earned in Division II (248 to men and 202 to women).

Olympians
 Reynaldo Brown, 1968 (U.S.)
 Mathyas Michael, 1968 (Ethiopia)
 Mohinder Gill, 1972 (India) 
 Patrice Donnelly, 1976 (U.S.)
 Karin Smith, 1976/1980/1984/1988 (U.S.)
 Bart Williams, 1980 (U.S.)
 Carmelo Rios, 1984 (Puerto Rico)
 Sue McNeal-Rembao, 1992 (U.S.)
 Sharon Hanson-Lowery, 1996 (U.S.)
 Stephanie Brown Trafton, 2004/2008/2012 (U.S.)
 Sharon Day-Monroe, 2008/2012 (U.S.)

Women's indoor volleyball
The women's indoor volleyball team has been one of the school's best sports programs in recent years and in the 1980s when the team reached No. 1 in the nation in 1985 in the AVCA Coaches Poll. On October 12, 1985, Cal Poly, coached by Mike Wilton, won the NIVT banner at UCLA before a crowd of about 2,500 fans, 3-1. Soon after, in the October 22 Top 25 Poll, the Mustangs were voted as the No. 1 team in the country. Stanford took back over the top spot in the week after.

In 2007, the team captured its second straight Big West title by posting a 15-1 conference record and a 23-8 record overall, and made it to the third round of the playoffs before losing to Stanford in the Sweet 16. The team also went 23-6 in 2006. Cal Poly returned to the AVCA national rankings and NCAA tournament in both 2017 & 2018 upon winning back-to-back Big West Conference championships, and then advanced to the second round of the NCAA tournament in 2019.

The team has an NCAA Division I Tournament record of 15-17 through seventeen total appearances.

Wrestling
The wrestling program at Cal Poly competes as a member of the Pac-12 Conference, which is traditionally one of the strongest conferences in college wrestling. Cal Poly has had two wrestlers (Tom Kline & Mark DiGirolamo) win the Division I NCAA Wrestling Championship and 50 wrestlers earn All-American honors at the Division I level. In addition to the program's success at the NCAA Championships, the program has crowned one champion at the National Collegiate Open Wrestling Championship. On January 30, 2014, Cal Poly hosted Oregon State in a very rare outdoor wrestling match. The match took place in Cal Poly's University Union Plaza following the weekly UU hour. The only other known outdoor matches have been hosted by The Citadel Bulldogs, including one during the 2012-13 season. Arizona State also wrestled Arizona outdoors in the 1970s.

The team competes in Mott Athletics Center on campus, opened back in 1960, seating over 3,000 people for home dual meets and tournaments.

Three former Mustang wrestlers after graduation went on to compete in mixed martial arts, more specifically the Ultimate Fighting Championships. The first is Chad Mendes who was a national runner-up at 141 lbs. in 2008, competing for the UFC since 2011 (challenging for a UFC featherweight title in 2012). The most famous wrestling alum is Chuck Liddell, who graduated in 1995 and is now a retired UFC Hall of Fame inductee being a former UFC Light heavyweight champion. More recently, 2020 NWCA All-American 197-pounder Tom Lane made his pro fighting debut in the middleweight classification, opening with a win in October 2021.

Prior to joining the Division I ranks via the Pac-12 (then the Pac-10) in 1987, Cal Poly was dominant in the College Division/Division II, winning the 1966 national championship and seven consecutive NCAA titles from 1968 to 1974.

The men's wrestling team has appeared in the NCAA Division I tournament 48 times, with their highest finish being fifth place in the 1968-69 school year.

Non-Varsity

Rugby
The Mustangs play college rugby in the California conference of Division 1-A. The Mustangs are often ranked in the Top 25 nationwide, and their rugby sevens team has been ranked as high as 7th. The Mustangs finished 8th in the nation at the 2011 USA Rugby Sevens Collegiate National Championships, and 12th at the 2012 competition.

NCAA championships and tournaments

Division I appearances in team bracket/meet
The Cal Poly Mustangs have competed in the NCAA tournament or in NCAA Division I Finals Meets on a team-scored basis across 19 active sports (10 men's and 9 women's).

 Baseball (3): 2009, 2013, 2014
 Beach volleyball (3): 2019, 2021, 2022
 Men's basketball (1): 2014
 Women's basketball (1): 2013
 Men's cross country (7): 1999, 2003, 2004, 2006, 2007, 2008, 2011
 Football (4): 2005, 2008, 2012, 2016
 Men's soccer (3): 1995, 2008, 2015
 Women's soccer (5): 1999, 2000, 2002, 2003, 2004
 Softball (2): 2007, 2009
 Men's swimming and diving (3): 1958, 1959, 2014
 Women's golf (3): 2017, 2021, 2022
 Men's tennis (3): 2011, 2012, 2014
 Women's tennis (2): 2003, 2011
 Men's indoor track and field (2): 1971, 1973
 Women's indoor track and field (7): 1983, 1999, 2000, 2003, 2004, 2005, 2008
 Men's outdoor track and field (11): 1960, 1961, 1964, 1998, 1999, 2000, 2001, 2002, 2004, 2005, 2007
 Women's outdoor track and field (13): 1995, 1996, 1998, 1999, 2001, 2002, 2003, 2004, 2005, 2007, 2008, 2009, 2011
 Women's volleyball (17): 1981, 1982, 1983, 1984, 1985, 1986, 1987, 1988, 1989, 1999, 2000, 2002, 2006, 2007, 2017, 2018, 2019
 Wrestling (48): 1958, 1968, 1969, 1972, 1975, 1976, 1977, 1978, 1979, 1980, 1981, 1982, 1983, 1984, 1985, 1986, 1988, 1989, 1990, 1991, 1992, 1993, 1994, 1995, 1996, 1997, 1998, 1999, 2000, 2001, 2002, 2003, 2004, 2005, 2006, 2007, 2008, 2009, 2010, 2011, 2012, 2014, 2015, 2017, 2018, 2019, 2021, 2022

NCAA titles won
Cal Poly has never won a team national championship at the NCAA Division I level.

Cal Poly previously won 35 national championships at the NCAA Division II level.

 Men's cross country (2): 1978, 1979
 Women's cross country (10): 1982, 1983, 1984, 1985, 1986, 1987, 1988, 1989, 1991
 Football (1): 1980
 Men's outdoor track and field (6): 1968, 1969, 1970, 1979, 1980, 1981
 Women's outdoor track and field (6): 1982, 1983, 1984, 1989, 1990, 1991
 Men's tennis (2): 1986, 1990
 Wrestling (8): 1966, 1968, 1969, 1970, 1971, 1972, 1973, 1974

Below is one national championship that was not bestowed by the NCAA:

 Women's outdoor track and field – Division II (1): 1981 (AIAW)

Below are six national club team championships:

 Co-ed cycling (1): 1992 (USA Cycling)
 Men's rodeo (3): 1970, 1971, 1973 (NIRA)
 Women's rodeo (1): 1989 (NIRA)
 Co-ed Triathlon (1): 1995 (USA Triathlon)

Individual NCAA Division I titles
Cal Poly had 12 Mustangs win NCAA individual championships at the Division I level.

At the NCAA Division II level, Cal Poly garnered 120 individual championships.

Athletic facilities
Anderson Aquatic Center 
The Anderson Aquatic Center is a swimming and diving venue in San Luis Obispo, California. It is home to the Cal Poly Mustangs men's and women's swimming and diving team of the NCAA Division I in the Big West Conference. A new $100,000 scoreboard was added in October 2014, with dual-ability to function as an HD video device.
Baggett Stadium
Robin Baggett Stadium is a baseball venue in San Luis Obispo, California. It is home to the Cal Poly Mustangs baseball team of the NCAA Division I in the Big West Conference. The stadium has a capacity of 1,734.
Doerr Family Field 
Doerr Family Field is the practice facility for football and soccer. Officially dedicated on February 2, 2018, the $4.8 million facility included a 140-yard synthetic-turf practice field allowing room for football sled work, along with goalposts, lights, a flagpole, a scoreboard and a pair of filming towers. The Cal Poly Corporation, Cal Poly Housing and Associated Students, Inc., collaborated on the project.
Janssen Field
 Bob Janssen Field is the home field for the Cal Poly Mustangs softball team. The venue has a capacity of 800. The softball program debuted a new hitting facility, breaking ground in November 2017, measuring 98 feet by 42 feet (20 feet high), with a dedication taking place May 5, 2018. The $400,000 project yielded two hitting bays on synthetic turf, with retractable netting systems allowing coaches and players to reconfigure to specific needs, a bullpen with three individual pitching rubbers, and a storage shed. In February 2019, a new Daktronics videoboard (25 feet wide by 14.5 feet tall) was added to the field.
Miller and Capriotti Athletics Complex
The Miller and Capriotti Athletics Complex is the home track and field venue for the men's and women's Cal Poly Mustangs track and field teams. Inaugurated on March 24, 2018, the $1.6 million project in association with Cal Poly Corporation, Associated Students, Inc. and Cal Poly Housing was part of the reshaping of the southeast corner of campus from Longview Lane to Grand Avenue adjacent to a new 435,000-square-foot student housing site. Beynon Sports installed a new track surface and a newly renovated field was put into place inside the re-balanced infield oval, with drought-tolerant Bandera Bermuda grass.
Mott Athletics Center
The Robert A. Mott Athletics Center is a 3,032-seat multi-purpose arena. It is home to the Cal Poly Mustangs men's and women's basketball teams, women's volleyball team and men's collegiate wrestling team. 
Mustang Beach Volleyball Complex
The Mustang Beach Volleyball Complex is the home venue for the Cal Poly women's beach volleyball team. In 2019, Cal Poly — which had hosted its home contests on nearby Pismo State Beach — proposed plans to construct five new on-campus beach volleyball courts, implementing an NCAA-regulation facility aspired to be one of the most elaborate in the country, including a videoboard. The project successfully broke ground in July 2019, with completion in November 2019.
Mustang Tennis Complex
The Mustang Tennis Complex is the home tennis venue for the men's and women's Cal Poly Mustangs tennis teams. A new scoreboard was added to the seven-court complex in October 2013, part of a $250,000 project also including resurfacing of the courts along with the implementation of windscreens surrounding the facility. The site was dedicated in association with Tennis Connect SLO on October 5, 2013.
 Mustang Memorial Field Presented by Dignity Health French Hospital Medical Center
Mustang Memorial Field Presented by Dignity Health French Hospital Medical Center is an 11,075-seat multi-purpose stadium in San Luis Obispo, California. It is home to the Cal Poly Mustangs football team of the Big Sky Conference in the Football Championship Subdivision (FCS) and the Cal Poly Mustangs men's soccer and women's soccer teams. The stadium, originally opened in 1935, received a massive renovation in November 2006.

Rivalries

The Battle for the Golden Horseshoe
Cal Poly's football rivalry with UC Davis, a fellow member of the Big Sky Conference, is played for the Golden Horseshoe.

The Blue-Green Rivalry

The main rival of the Cal Poly Mustangs are the UC Santa Barbara Gauchos who compete together in the Blue–Green Rivalry. The Blue-Green Rivalry, which started in November 1921 with a football game, was formalized in 2009. This new format calculates earned points between Cal Poly and UCSB to determine a winner based on their teams' competitive results against each other. Additionally, collegesoccernews.com ranked UC Santa Barbara vs. Cal Poly as the Greatest Rivalry in College Soccer.

Fresno State
From 1956 to 1975, Cal Poly and Fresno State traded the Victory Bell trophy, which was donated to Cal Poly in 1952. The trophy, which weighed about 200 pounds, was ultimately retired due to repeated theft. The two programs didn't play each other from 1986 through 2009, but brought back matchups in 2010, 2013, 2021 and 2022. In the 46-game all-time series, Fresno State leads 34-10-2.

Renowned Cal Poly Mustangs alumni

 Ramses Barden, New York Giants wide receiver
 Bobby Beathard, NFL GM/Pro Football Hall of Fame inductee
 Reynaldo Brown, Olympic Track and Field high jumper
 Stephanie Brown Trafton, 2008 Olympic gold medalist discus thrower
 Kaaron Conwright, USATF sprinter (100-meter dash/200m dash)
 Kevin Correia, MLB pitcher and 2011 All-Star
 Jonathan Dally, Professional football quarterback
 Gary Davis, NFL running back
 Sharon Day-Monroe, Two-time U.S. Olympic track & field heptathlete
 Jimmy Deiparine, Philippines record-setting swimmer
 Nick Dzubnar, Los Angeles Chargers linebacker
 Mohinder Gill, NCAA triple jump champion and Olympic triple jumper (India)
 Victor J. Glover, NASA astronaut
 Chris Gocong, Philadelphia Eagles/Cleveland Browns linebacker
 Mitch Haniger, Seattle Mariners All-Star
 Sharon Hanson, Olympic track and field heptathlete
 Sierra Hyland, Olympic softball pitcher
 Asa Jackson, San Francisco 49ers cornerback
 Damone Johnson, Los Angeles Rams tight end
 Mel Kaufman, NFL linebacker/Washington Redskins Super Bowl champion
 Mike Krukow, MLB pitcher/1986 All-Star/San Francisco Giants broadcaster
 Brooks Lee, 2022 Minnesota Twins 8th overall (first round) draft choice
 Gene Lenz, Olympic swimmer
 Chuck Liddell, former UFC champion/MMA Hall of Famer
 John Madden, Oakland Raiders Super Bowl-winning coach/NFL commentator/Pro Football Hall of Famer
 Chad Mendes, 2008 NCAA second-place wrestler/UFC member
 Steve Miller, Nike director of global sports marketing
 Dana Nafziger, Tampa Bay Buccaneers linebacker
 Bud Norris, MLB pitcher
 Borislav Novachkov, Olympic wrestler
 David Nwaba, NBA guard
 Gina Oceguera, Mexico World Cup soccer player/WUSA pro
 John Orton, California Angels first-round draft pick
 Joe Prunty, NBA coach
 Carmelo Rios, Olympic track and field athlete (Puerto Rico)
 Loren Roberts, pro golfer
 Karin Smith, Olympic javelin thrower
 Ozzie Smith, St. Louis Cardinals shortstop/MLB Hall of Famer
 Alex G. Spanos, San Diego Chargers owner
 Chris Thomas, San Francisco 49ers wide receiver
 Ted Tollner, College football coach
 Cecil Turner, Chicago Bears Pro Bowl kick returner
 Drake U'u, Sacramento Kings assistant GM

Broadcast information
Cal Poly's ESPN Radio affiliate is ESPN 1280 AM The Ticket (KXTK). The station has added 101.7 FM carrying Mustangs broadcasts, with greater reach throughout San Luis Obispo County. In addition, Chris Sylvester hosts the Mustang Insider podcast with Learfield. As of 2021, Big West-telecast events involving Cal Poly switched to ESPN+, while Big Sky-streamed football games featuring the Mustangs also swung to the network approximate to the same time.

References

External links